Harrisia martinii, commonly called the Martin applecactus, is a species of night-blooming, rope-like cacti native to South America. With large showy flowers that attract the hawk moth, it is considered by some a useful landscape plant in areas that do not freeze.

Harrisia martinii is considered an exotic invasive in Australia, South Africa, and the U.S. state of Hawaii.

The plant is spiny with edible red globular fruit.

References

martinii
Cacti of South America